The Denver Pioneers men's basketball team represents the University of Denver and competes in the NCAA Division I men's college basketball in Denver, Colorado. They are led by head coach Jeff Wulbrun and are members of the Summit League. They play their home games at Magness Arena.

The Pioneers are one of 35 eligible Division I programs to have never appeared in the NCAA Division I men's basketball tournament.

History
Denver began intercollegiate basketball in 1904 and played at the regional level prior to World War II. After the war, DU became an NCAA Division I level program between the 1950s and 1979, playing in the Mountain States and old Skyline conferences before becoming an NCAA Division I independent in 1962.

In 1979, DU's declining finances forced the program to drop down to the Division II and NAIA levels until 1998.

DU moved back up to Division I status in 1998 and joined the Sun Belt Conference in 1999. In 2012, the Pioneers moved from the Sun Belt to the Western Athletic Conference. After only one year in the WAC, they joined The Summit League in July, 2013, where they play today.

Alumni
Notable former Denver basketball players include:

David Adkins, played at Denver in the mid-1970s, later became known as comedian/TV actor Sinbad.
Byron Beck, ABA and NBA player, number retired by Denver Nuggets
Rodney Billups, Euroleague player, former Denver Men's Basketball head coach
Vince Boryla, 1948 all-American, 1948 Gold Medal US Olympian, NBA All-Star player, coach, and executive
Ronnie Harrell (born 1996), basketball player in the Israeli Basketball Premier League
Phil Heath, current Mr. Olympia bodybuilder
Ken Michelman, played with David Adkins at DU, became a TV actor on The White Shadow, Grey's Anatomy, and other programs
Royce O'Neale, Utah Jazz, played two years at Denver, all-WAC forward before transferring to Baylor
 Jake Pemberton (born 1996), American-Israeli basketball player in the Israeli National League

Postseason results

NCAA Division II Tournament results
The Pioneers have appeared in three NCAA Division II Tournaments. Their combined record is 1–3.

NAIA Tournament results
The Pioneers have appeared in two NAIA Tournaments. Their combined record is 0–2.

NIT results
The Pioneers have appeared in the National Invitation Tournament (NIT) three times. Their combined record is 1–3.

References

External links